Landaff is a town in Grafton County, New Hampshire, United States. As of the 2020 census, the town population was 446.

History 

The name on the town charter is "Llandaff", after the Bishop of Llandaff, chaplain to England's King George III. Originally, however, the land was granted as "Whitcherville" to James Avery and 60 others on January 31, 1764. But those settlers forfeited their grant by failure to comply with the requirements of the charter, so the territory was re-granted to Dartmouth College on January 19, 1770.

Settlements were made under the Dartmouth grant. Roads and a mill were built at the expense of the college, and on November 11, 1774, the town was incorporated. After the Revolutionary War, however, the first grantees successfully claimed that their forfeiture was illegal, so the college had to abandon its title and lose what it had expended in making the settlements.

Landaff was originally much larger than today. It was changed by legislative actions over the years:

 On July 2, 1845, it gained a small tract from the then-adjoining town of Lincoln.
 On June 23, 1859, all of Landaff lying northwest of the Ammonoosuc River was annexed to the town of Lisbon.
 On July 20, 1876, the town was divided, with the eastern half becoming the town of Easton.

The Lisbon Area Historical Society promotes the public's interest in and appreciation for the towns of Lisbon, Landaff and Lyman, and maintains the collection, preservation and cataloging of materials which establish or illustrate the history of the three towns, their indigenous history and heritage, their exploration, settlement and development, as well as their cultural and artistic heritage.

Geography 

The Ammonoosuc River defines part of the northwestern boundary of the town, and the Wild Ammonoosuc River flows through the southern part of the town. Landaff lies fully within the Connecticut River watershed.

The southern half of the town is in the White Mountain National Forest, accessible via Cobble Hill Trail and Ore Hill Trail from the north. Natural features of Landaff include many viewsheds, mountain summits, wetlands, undeveloped woodland and farm land. The main bodies of water in town are Chandler Pond, Jericho Pond and Gordon Pond.

Wildlife 

Landaff is home to numerous species of wildlife. Black bear, moose, white-tail deer, beaver, eastern turkey, and coyote are among the animals living in the thousands of open acres, as well as ruffed grouse and other upland birds.

Recreation

Outdoor recreational opportunities abound for hunting, fishing, cross-country skiing, snowshoeing, hiking, nature observation and snowmobiling.

Demographics 

As of the census of 2000, there were 378 people, 154 households, and 107 families residing in the town.  The population density was 13.3 people per square mile (5.1/km2).  There were 214 housing units at an average density of 7.5 per square mile (2.9/km2).  The racial makeup of the town was 96.56% White, 0.26% Native American, and 3.17% from two or more races. Hispanic or Latino of any race were 0.79% of the population.

There were 154 households, out of which 29.2% had children under the age of 18 living with them, 61.7% were married couples living together, 6.5% had a female householder with no husband present, and 29.9% were non-families. 21.4% of all households were made up of individuals, and 11.0% had someone living alone who was 65 years of age or older.  The average household size was 2.45 and the average family size was 2.88.

In the town, the population was spread out, with 23.8% under the age of 18, 5.6% from 18 to 24, 27.0% from 25 to 44, 28.8% from 45 to 64, and 14.8% who were 65 years of age or older.  The median age was 42 years. For every 100 females, there were 93.8 males.  For every 100 females age 18 and over, there were 95.9 males.

The median income for a household in the town was $41,964, and the median income for a family was $48,500. Males had a median income of $35,156 versus $23,438 for females. The per capita income for the town was $18,033.  About 6.9% of families and 7.1% of the population were below the poverty line, including 5.7% of those under age 18 and 12.9% of those age 65 or over.

Notable people
Harry Chandler (1864–1944), newspaper publisher, real estate investor
Mary Noyes Farr (1853–1938), physician, educator, later based South Dakota
Samuel H. Roys (1821–1857), Wisconsin politician

References 

 Hamilton Child, "History of Landaff, Grafton County, New Hampshire", Gazetteer of Grafton County, N.H., 1709–1886, Syracuse, N.Y.: H. Child, June 1886, p. 396+; www.nh.searchroots.com, maintained by Janice A. Brown

External links 
 
 New Hampshire Economic and Labor Market Information Bureau Profile
 Lisbon Area Historical Society

Towns in Grafton County, New Hampshire
Populated places established in 1774
Towns in New Hampshire